Werner Baldessarini (born 23 January 1945, in Kufstein in Tyrol, Germany) is an Austrian fashion designer and businessman. He was formerly chairman of Hugo Boss.

Biography
Werner Baldessarini is the son of a textile wholesaler, and in turn completed an apprenticeship as a textile merchandiser. He started working in Munich for a Wagenheimer retail store, where he became chief of purchases. In 1975, he joined the company Hugo Boss. He was promoted chief designer and joined Hugo Boss' executive board in 1988. He was asked by the founders of Hugo Boss to drive the growth of the company.

References

External links

Austrian businesspeople
Austrian fashion designers
People from Kufstein
1945 births
Living people